Rolando Rodrigo Zapata Bello (born 11 August 1968) is a Mexican politician and lawyer affiliated with the PRI who served as Governor of Yucatán, having taken office from 2012 to 2018.

He also served as Deputy of the LXI Legislature of the Mexican Congress representing Yucatán.

References

External links
Official website

1968 births
Living people
Politicians from Yucatán (state)
People from Mérida, Yucatán
20th-century Mexican lawyers
Members of the Chamber of Deputies (Mexico)
Governors of Yucatán (state)
Institutional Revolutionary Party politicians
21st-century Mexican politicians